Johann Heinrich Linck (the elder, 1674–1734) was a German pharmacist and naturalist. He was born in Leipzig and ran the family pharmacy known as "The Golden Lion". He wrote a treatise on sea stars, De stellis marinis liber singularis (1733). The genus Linckia of sea stars is named after him.

Linck's son was also named Johann Heinrich Linck (the younger, 1734–1807).

References

1674 births
1734 deaths
Fellows of the Royal Society